Trojan Oaks Golf Course was a 9-hole championship golf course on the campus of Troy University. It was for use by the general public, golf team, and students. The par for the course was 36 with a course rating of 35.5 and a slope rating of 125. The greens and fairways were both Bermuda grass. The course was built over the course of two years and opened in 1977 under the supervision of Chancellor Ralph Wyatt Adams. The course was closed in March 2010 in order to build a new basketball arena on the grounds.

The course does not attract a great deal of extra-county players, other than faculty and students of the university.  This is in part due to the presence of a course on the world-renowned Robert Trent Jones Golf Trail in nearby Montgomery.

The remaining parts of the course that were left following the construction of Trojan Arena have been converted into what is now called the Troy Golf Practice Course.  The $1.5 million renovation of the course was completed in 2013.  It uses 40 acres of the original Trojan Oaks Golf Course and created a 9-hole, par-34 practice course plus state-of-the-art putting and chipping greens, a wedge practice area, a full driving range, and a new golf clubhouse.  A golf clubhouse has coaches offices and an indoor/outdoor lounge area.  The courses hitting bays feature FlightScope Technology for swing analysis, Sam PuttLab for putting analysis, and BodiTrak monitors to measure the body weight shifting of a players swing.  It is the only course of its kind on the Sun Belt Conference.

The Course 
Note: All tee distances are from the men's (white) tee box
There are trees to the right and the ninth hole is to the left.
There is a creek/marsh down a hill starting  after the tee and ending  in front of the pin, at a steep incline down and up, respectively.
There is a large sand trap the wraps the entire left of the green and a sharp -down slope to the right.
The hole is sometime referred to as "The Driving Range" by local students due to the straightness and breadth of the fairway.
The hole is bordered on its right by woods and, up a hill, the sixth hole and on the left by the fifth hole, which is down a hill. The final fairways slopes up from the lake to the green.
The right of the course is a sharp downhill slope to the 4th hole fairway and 5th hole tee box. After the dogleg the hole is straight with several bunkers around the green.
The pin is roughly  lower in elevation than the tee box with fairway from the tee box to the green. One bunker comes into play in the front right of the green.
A drive of at least  is required to clear the swamp. Two large trees line either side of the fairway and the green ends up being at roughly the same elevation as the tee box. Most locals consider this the toughest green to putt a long distance on.
The hole is level, without a single bunker, and the green is the largest on the course.

Gallery

References

Golf clubs and courses in Alabama
Buildings and structures in Pike County, Alabama
College golf clubs and courses in the United States
Troy University